Docking@Home was a volunteer computing project hosted by the University of Delaware and running on the Berkeley Open Infrastructure for Network Computing (BOINC) software platform.  It models protein-ligand docking using the CHARMM program. Volunteer computing allows an extensive search of protein-ligand docking conformations and selection of near-native ligand conformations are achieved by using ligand based hierarchical clustering. The ultimate aim was the development of new pharmaceutical drugs.

The project was retired on May 23, 2014.

See also 
List of volunteer computing projects

References

Further reading

External links 
 
 

 Science in society
Volunteer computing projects
Internet properties disestablished in 2014
University of Delaware
Free science software